The Peace of Tournai (Vrede van Doornik in Dutch) was an agreement between the Burgundian Duke Philip II and the rebellious city of Ghent signed on 18 December 1385 which put an end to the Revolt of Ghent (1379–1385).

The treaty said that Ghent kept its privileges, that the rebels would be given amnesty and that, because it was the time of the Western Schism, Ghent would be free in recognizing the pope of its choice. However, Ghent was required to give up its treaty with kingdom of England and recognize the King of France.

References

Bibliography 
 Françoise Autrand, Charles VI le roi fou

Tournai
Treaties of the Burgundian Netherlands
1380s in France
Tournai
Treaties of the Hundred Years' War
History of Tournai
1385 in Europe
Peace treaties
14th century in the county of Flanders